Giorgio Ambrosoli (17 October 1933 – 11 July 1979) was an Italian lawyer who was gunned down while investigating the malpractice of banker Michele Sindona.

Liquidating Sindona’s financial empire
Appointed by the court as liquidator of the Banca Privata Italiana, one of the Italian banks controlled by Sicilian banker Michele Sindona, which was forced into liquidation, he found evidence of criminal manipulations. He provided the US Justice Department with evidence to convict Sindona for his role in the collapse of the Franklin National Bank.

According to Ambrosoli, Sindona paid a US$5.6 million commission to "an American bishop and a Milanese banker". Official Italian sources confirmed that it concerned Paul Marcinkus, of the Vatican Bank, and Roberto Calvi, president of Banco Ambrosiano.

Murder
On 11 July 1979, only hours after talking to US authorities, he was shot dead by three Mafia hitmen commissioned by Michele Sindona.

Sindona feared that Ambrosoli would expose his manipulations in the Banca Privata Italiana case. Shortly before he was killed, the American Mafia hitman William Arico, a convicted bank robber, invoked the name of Giulio Andreotti – the influential Christian Democrat politician close to Sindona – in a threatening phone call taped by Ambrosoli. Arico fell to his death while trying to escape from a federal prison in New York in 1984. Andreotti later replied in an interview that Ambrosoli "was a person who, in Romanesque words, was looking for it".

In 1986 Sindona was sentenced to life imprisonment for having ordered the murder.

Mafia involvement in murder
According to the Mafia turncoat (pentito) Francesco Marino Mannoia, Sindona laundered the proceeds of heroin trafficking for the Bontade-Spatola-Inzerillo-Gambino network. The mafiosi were determined to get their money back and would have played an important role in Sindona's attempt to save his banks.

Ambrosoli was killed shortly after he had a talk with Palermo Police chief Boris Giuliano, who discovered cheques and other documents which indicated that Sindona had been recycling the proceeds from heroin sales by the Mafia through the Vatican Bank to his Amincor Bank in Switzerland. Ten days after the killing of Ambrosoli, Giuliano was shot and killed by the Mafia on 21 July 1979.

Ambrosoli was posthumously awarded with a medal for civic heroism. In 1995 a film about him was made, entitled A Middle-Class Hero, directed by Michele Placido.

References

Sources
  Stajano, Corrado (1995). Un eroe borghese. Il caso dell'avvocato Ambrosoli assassinato dalla mafia politica, Turin: Einaudi, .
Sterling, Claire (1990). Octopus. How the long reach of the Sicilian Mafia controls the global narcotics trade, New York: Simon & Schuster, 
Stille, Alexander (1995). Excellent Cadavers. The Mafia and the Death of the First Italian Republic, New York: Vintage 
  Lucarelli, Carlo (2002). Misteri d'Italia. I casi di Blu notte. Turin: Einaudi, .

1933 births
1979 deaths
Lawyers from Milan
People murdered by the Sicilian Mafia
Deaths related to the Years of Lead (Italy)
Italian murder victims
People murdered in Italy
Assassinated lawyers
Deaths by firearm in Italy
20th-century Italian lawyers
University of Milan alumni
1979 murders in Italy